Alfred George Wheeler (March 2, 1899 – June 16, 1982) was an American football and basketball player and coach.  He served as the head football and men's basketball coach at Amherst College in Amherst, Massachusetts, before serving in the same roles at Peru State College in Peru, Nebraska

As a college athlete at Oberlin College, he quarterbacked his team to a 1921 victory over Ohio State.

Head coaching record

Football

References

1899 births
1982 deaths
American football quarterbacks
American men's basketball players
Amherst Mammoths baseball coaches
Amherst Mammoths football coaches
Amherst Mammoths men's basketball coaches
Basketball coaches from Ohio
Basketball players from Ohio
Oberlin Yeomen baseball players
Oberlin Yeomen basketball players
Oberlin Yeomen football players
Iowa State Cyclones football coaches
Peru State Bobcats football coaches
Peru State Bobcats men's basketball coaches
People from Oberlin, Ohio
Players of American football from Ohio